Pantawid ng Pag-ibig: At Home Together Concert is a six-hour Philippine benefit concert television special held on March 22, 2020, in support of ABS-CBN Foundation's efforts in helping those heavily affected by the 2020 Luzon enhanced community quarantine caused by the COVID-19 pandemic in the Philippines. Hosted by TV Patrol Weekend news anchors Alvin Elchico and Zen Hernandez, the virtual concert featured musical performances and appearances by talents from ABS-CBN, appearing from their respective homes. The special aired on ABS-CBN and several of its sister broadcast and cable channels, radio stations, and digital streaming platforms. The special was also aired on other stations that are members of the Kapisanan ng mga Brodkaster ng Pilipinas.

Towards the end of the show, it was announced that the concert has raised nearly ₱237 million in pledges and donations.

Performances

Appearances

 Agot Isidro
 Alex Gonzaga*
 Amy Perez
 Angel Aquino
 Angel Locsin
 Angelica Panganiban
 Anne Curtis
 Anthony Taberna
 Arci Muñoz
 Arjo Atayde
 Bea Alonzo
 Beauty Gonzalez
 Bernadette Sembrano
 Boy Abunda
 Charo Santos-Concio
 Cherry Pie Picache
 Chiara Zambrano
 Coco Martin
 Daniel Padilla
 Dimples Romana
 Donny Pangilinan
 Edu Manzano
 Edward Barber
 Elisse Joson
 Enchong Dee
 Eula Valdez
 Gerald Anderson
 Isabel Oli
 Ivana Alawi*
 Jane De Leon
 Jane Oineza
 Janella Salvador
 Jhong Hilario
 Jodi Sta. Maria
 John Arcilla
 John Prats
 Jorge Cariño
 Judy Ann Santos
 Julia Barretto
 Julia Montes
 Julius Babao
 Karen Davila
 Kathryn Bernardo
 Kim Atienza
 Kim Chiu*
 Korina Sanchez
 Lorna Tolentino
 Luis Manzano
 Maja Salvador
 Marco Gumabao
 Maricel Soriano
 Maymay Entrata
 Melai Cantiveros*
 Nadine Lustre
 Noli de Castro
 Pia Wurtzbach
 Piolo Pascual
 Pokwang* 
 Ria Atayde
 RK Bagatsing
 Robi Domingo
 Rowell Santiago
 Ruffa Gutierrez
 Ryan Bang
 Sylvia Sanchez
 Ted Failon
 The Gold Squad (Francine Diaz, Andrea Brillantes, Kyle Echarri, and Seth Fedelin)*
 Tony Labrusca
 Vhong Navarro
 Vina Morales
 Vivoree Esclito
 Yassi Pressman

* made vlogs that were broadcast during the event.

Broadcast
The special was broadcast on Sunday, March 22, 2020, at 7pm on ABS-CBN and was simulcast on the network's sister television networks such as S+A, ANC, DZMM TeleRadyo, Jeepney TV, Myx, Metro Channel, and Asianovela Channel. It was also broadcast on radio via DZMM Radyo Patrol 630 and MOR Philippines. Internationally, the special was broadcast on The Filipino Channel. It was also streamed live on iWant TFC and on ABS-CBN's official Facebook and YouTube accounts. The special was also aired on other stations like Monster RX 93.1 owned by Audiovisual Communicators Inc, and DZRH owned by Manila Broadcasting Company.

References

2020 in Philippine television
2020 television specials
Philippine television specials
ABS-CBN television specials
COVID-19 pandemic benefit concerts
Television shows about the COVID-19 pandemic
Simulcasts